Anto Gonzales is a former Filipino footballer. He is the current head coach of University of the Philippines football team.

Playing career

Club
Gonzales played for Diliman Victory Liner F.C. until 2012 when he was loan by Diliman to Loyola Meralco Sparks F.C. and played for the club in the 2012 UFL season. Diliman and Loyola agreed that the former will recall Gonzales in the following season if Diliman gets promoted to the 1st division which they managed to do so. Diliman later bought by Pachanga F.C. and became Pachangca Diliman F.C. Gonzales returned to the newly merged club.

On December 7, 2015, Loyola announced that they have signed in Gonzales.

International
He was also a former player for the Philippine national football team. He was part of the squad that won the 2012 Philippine Peace Cup.

Coaching career
Gonzales coaches both the men's and women's team of the University of the Philippines since at least UAAP 76. In 2016 at UAAP Season 78, he led both the women's and men's team of UP to win the UAAP Championships. The 2016 win of the women's team under his watch was the first ever for the squad in their history in playing at UAAP.

In 2019, Gonzales was appointed as assistant coach of the Philippines U-23.

Career as an educator
In November 2012, it was reported that Gonzales is teaching at the Physical Education and Sports Science subjects at the UP College of Human Kinetics simultaneously while playing competitively and coaching in football.

References

Living people
Filipino footballers
Filipino football head coaches
Philippines international footballers
Association football midfielders
F.C. Meralco Manila players
Academic staff of the University of the Philippines
1981 births